Derek Alan Combs (born February 28, 1979) is a former American football defensive back who played in the National Football League (NFL) for the Oakland Raiders and Green Bay Packers. He played college football for Ohio State.

High school career
Combs graduated from Grove City High School in Grove City, Ohio, where he was the star tailback and was voted Ohio's Mr. Football in 1996. He has his own spot in the trophy case at Grove City High School.

College career
He was a tailback in college for the Ohio State Buckeyes.

Professional career
Combs was selected by the Oakland Raiders in the 7th round (228th overall pick) of the 2001 NFL Draft as a cornerback. He played in four games for the Raiders in 2002 and eight games for the Green Bay Packers in 2003.

References

1979 births
Living people
Players of American football from Columbus, Ohio
American football halfbacks
American football cornerbacks
Ohio State Buckeyes football players
Oakland Raiders players
Amsterdam Admirals players
Green Bay Packers players